Kletten is a hill in Sunnfjord Municipality in Vestland county, Norway. It steeply rises up above the village of Naustdal to the southeast. The hill rises continuously from sea level at the mouth of the Nausta River.

References

External links
Kletten at Norgeskart

Mountains of Vestland
Mountains under 1000 metres
Sunnfjord